Kelly G. Fairchild (born April 9, 1973) is an American former professional ice hockey player. He played in the NHL with the Toronto Maple Leafs, Dallas Stars and the Colorado Avalanche between 1996 and 2002. The rest of his career, which lasted from 1994 to 2009, was spent in various minor leagues, as well as time in Europe and Asia.

Playing career
Fairchild was selected in the 1991 NHL Entry Draft by the Los Angeles Kings in the 7th round, 152nd overall. He attended Grand Rapids High School and was a standout play-maker before committing to a collegiate career with the University of Wisconsin in 1991. In 1993–94, his junior year with the Badgers, Kelly led the Western Collegiate Hockey Association in scoring with 64 points and was named to the WCHA's First All-Star Team and finished as a runner up in the Hobey Baker Award.

Prior to his first professional season, Fairchild was traded by the Kings, along with Dixon Ward, Guy Leveque and Shayne Toporowski, to the Toronto Maple Leafs for Eric Lacroix, Chris Snell and fourth round pick (Eric Belanger) on October 3, 1994. After two seasons with the Maple Leafs AHL affiliate, St. John's he made his NHL debut appearing in a single game and recording an assist in the 1995–96 season. Over the next couple of seasons, Kelly played in 22 further games with the Maple Leafs, but ultimately assigned to minor league affiliates.

On July 2, 1998, Fairchild signed a two-year contract with the Dallas Stars. Despite contributing largely to the offense of the Michigan K-Wings, he was only able to make a lone Star appearance in 1998–99. Looked upon as an established minor-league veteran, Fairchild was then signed by the Colorado Avalanche in 2000. Fairchild was assigned to AHL affiliate, the Hershey Bears, for the most part of two seasons but played in 10 Avalanche games and scoring his first 2, and only, goals in the 2001–02 season.

After totaling just 34 NHL games, Kelly left North America when he signed with Eisbären Berlin of the German DEL in 2002. After a prolific first season in the DEL with Berlin, Fairchild was unexpectedly chosen to the United States team to participate in the 2003 World Championships in Finland. As an understrength team, Fairchild scored in the upset loss to Denmark. Fairchild finished with 5 goals in 6 games as Team USA finished a disappointing 13th out of 16 teams. Fairchild was then a part of two championships with Berlin in 2005 and 2006 before leaving in 2007 to join the Vienna Capitals in the Austrian Hockey League.

In his last season of professional hockey, Fairchild won the Asia League Ice Hockey Championship with the Nippon Paper Cranes in 2009.

Career statistics

Regular season and playoffs

International

Awards and honors

References

External links
 

1973 births
Living people
American men's ice hockey centers
Colorado Avalanche players
Dallas Stars players
Eisbären Berlin players
Hershey Bears players
Ice hockey players from Minnesota
Sportspeople from Hibbing, Minnesota
Kalamazoo Wings (1974–2000) players
Los Angeles Kings draft picks
Milwaukee Admirals (IHL) players
Nippon Paper Cranes players
Orlando Solar Bears (IHL) players
St. John's Maple Leafs players
Toronto Maple Leafs players
Vienna Capitals players
Wisconsin Badgers men's ice hockey players